Project Nike (Greek: Νίκη, "Victory") was a U.S. Army project, proposed in May 1945 by Bell Laboratories, to develop a line-of-sight anti-aircraft missile system. The project delivered the United States' first operational anti-aircraft missile system, the Nike Ajax, in 1953. A great number of the technologies and rocket systems used for developing the Nike Ajax were re-used for a number of functions, many of which were given the "Nike" name (after Nike, the goddess of victory from Greek mythology).
The missile's first-stage solid rocket booster became the basis for many types of rocket including the Nike Hercules missile and NASA's Nike Smoke rocket, used for upper-atmosphere research.

History

Project Nike began during 1944 when the War Department demanded a new air defense system to combat new jet aircraft, as existing gun-based systems proved largely incapable of dealing with the speeds and altitudes at which jet aircraft operated. Two proposals were accepted. Bell Laboratories offered Project Nike while General Electric proposed a much longer-ranged, collision-course system named Project Thumper, which eventually delivered the BOMARC missile.

Bell Labs' proposal would have to deal with bombers flying at 500 mph (800 km/h) or more, at altitudes of up to 60,000 ft (20,000 m).
At these speeds, even a supersonic rocket is no longer fast enough to be simply aimed at the target. The missile must "lead" the target to ensure the target is hit before the missile depletes its fuel. This means that the missile and target cannot be tracked by a single radar, increasing the complexity of the system. One part was well developed. By this point, the US had considerable experience with lead-calculating analog computers, starting with the British Kerrison Predictor and a series of increasingly capable U.S. designs.

For Nike, three radars were used. The acquisition radar (such as the AN/GSS-1 Electronic Search Central with the AN/TPS-1D radar) searched for a target to be handed over to the Target Tracking Radar (TTR) for tracking. The Missile Tracking Radar (MTR) tracked the missile by way of a transponder, as the missile's radar signature alone was not sufficient. The MTR also commanded the missile by way of pulse-position modulation, the pulses were received, decoded and then amplified back for the MTR to track. Once the tracking radars were locked the system was able to work automatically following launch, barring any unexpected occurrences. The computer compared the two radars' directions, along with information on the speeds and distances, to calculate the intercept point and steer the missile. The entirety of this system was provided by the Bell System's electronics firm, Western Electric.

The Douglas-built missile was a two-stage missile using a solid fuel booster stage and a liquid fueled (IRFNA/UDMH) second stage. The missile could reach a maximum speed of 1,000 mph (1,600 km/h), an altitude of 70,000 ft (21 km) and had a range of 25 miles (40 km). The missile contained an unusual three part payload, with explosive fragmentation charges at three points down the length of the missile to help ensure a lethal hit. The missile's limited range was seen by critics as a serious flaw, because it often meant that the missile had to be situated very close to the area it was protecting.

After disputes between the Army and the Air Force (see the Key West Agreement), all longer-range systems were assigned to the Air Force during 1948. They merged their own long-range research with Project Thumper, while the Army continued to develop Nike. During 1950 the Army formed the Army Anti-Aircraft Command (ARAACOM) to operate batteries of anti-aircraft guns and missiles. ARAACOM was renamed the US Army Air Defense Command (USARADCOM) during 1957. It adopted a simpler acronym, ARADCOM, in 1961.

Nike Ajax

The first successful Nike test was during November 1951, intercepting a drone B-17 Flying Fortress. The first type, Nike Ajax (MIM-3), were deployed starting in 1953. The Army initially ordered 1,000 missiles and 60 sets of equipment. They were placed to protect strategic and tactical sites within the US.  As a last-line of defense from air attack, they were positioned to protect cities as well as military installations. The missile was deployed first at Fort Meade, Maryland during December 1953. A further 240 launch sites were built up to 1962. They replaced 896 radar-guided anti-aircraft guns, operated by the National Guard or Army to protect certain key sites. This left a handful of 75 mm Skysweeper emplacements as the only anti-aircraft artillery remaining in use by the US. By 1957 the Regular Army AAA units had been replaced by missile battalions. During 1958 the Army National Guard began to replace their guns and adopt the Ajax system.

Each launch site had three parts, separated by at least 1,000 yards (914 m).  One part (designated C) of about six acres (24,000 m2) contained the IFC (Integrated Fire Control) radar systems to detect incoming targets (acquisition and target tracking) and direct the missiles (missile tracking), along with the computer systems to plot and direct the intercept. The second part (designated L), around forty acres (160,000 m2), held 1–3 underground missile magazines each serving a group of four launch assemblies and included a safety zone. The site had a crew of 109 officers and men who ran the site continuously.  One launcher would be on 15 minutes alert, two on 30 minutes and one on two hour alert. The third part was the administrative area (designated A), which was usually co-located with the IFC and contained the battery headquarters, barracks, mess, recreation hall, and motor pool. The actual configuration of the Nike sites differed depending on geography.  Whenever possible the sites were placed on existing military bases or National Guard armories; otherwise land had to be purchased.

The Nike batteries were organized in Defense Areas and placed around population centers and strategic locations such as long-range bomber bases, nuclear plants, and (later) ICBM sites. The Nike sites in a Defense Area formed a circle around these cities and bases. There was no fixed number of Nike batteries in a Defense Area and the actual number of batteries varied from a low of two in the Barksdale AFB Defense Area to a high of 22 in the Chicago Defense Area.  In the Continental United States the sites were numbered from 01 to 99 starting at the north and increasing clockwise. The numbers had no relation to actual compass headings, but generally Nike sites numbered 01 to 25 were to the northeast and east, those numbered 26 to 50 were to the southeast and south, those numbered 51 to 75 were to the southwest and west, and those numbered 76 to 99 were to the northwest and north. The Defense Areas in the Continental United States were identified by a one- or two-letter code which were related to the city name. Thus those Nike sites starting with C were in the Chicago Defense Area, those starting with HM were in the Homestead AFB/Miami Defense Area, those starting with NY were in the New York Defense Area, and so forth. As an example Nike Site SF-88L refers to the launcher area (L) of the battery located in the northwestern part (88) of the San Francisco Defense Area (SF).

During the early-to-mid-1960s the Nike Ajax batteries were upgraded to the Hercules system. The new missiles had greater range and destructive power, so about half as many batteries provided the same defensive capability. Regular Army batteries were either upgraded to the Hercules system or decommissioned. Army National Guard units continued to use the Ajax system until 1964, when they too upgraded to Hercules. Eventually, the Regular Army units were replaced by the National Guard as a cost-saving measure, since the Guard units could return to their homes when off duty.

A Nike Ajax missile accidentally exploded at a battery in Leonardo, New Jersey on 22 May 1958, killing 6 soldiers and 4 civilians.  A memorial can be found at Fort Hancock in the Sandy Hook Unit of Gateway National Recreation Area.

Nike Hercules

Even as Nike Ajax was being tested, work started on Nike-B, later renamed Nike Hercules (MIM-14). It improved speed, range and accuracy, and could intercept ballistic missiles. The Hercules had a range of about 100 miles (160 km), a top speed in excess of 3,000 mph (4,800 km/h) and a maximum altitude of around 150,000 ft(30 km). It had solid fuel boost and sustainer rocket motors. The boost phase was four of the Nike Ajax boosters strapped together. In the electronics, some vacuum tubes were replaced with more reliable solid-state components.

The missile also had an optional nuclear warhead to improve the probability of a kill.  The W-31 warhead had four variants offering 2, 10, 20 and 30 kiloton yields. The 20 kt version was used in the Hercules system. At sites in the United States the missile almost exclusively carried a nuclear warhead. Sites in foreign nations typically had a mix of high explosive and nuclear warheads. The fire control of the Nike system was also improved with the Hercules and included a surface-to-surface mode which was successfully tested in Alaska. The mode change was accomplished by changing a single plug on the warhead from the "Safe Plug" to "Surface to Air" or "Surface to Surface".

The Nike Hercules was deployed starting in June 1958. First deployed to Chicago, 393 Hercules ground systems were manufactured. By 1960 ARADCOM had 88 Hercules batteries and 174 Ajax batteries, defending 23 zones across 30 states. Peak deployment was in 1963 with 134 Hercules batteries not including the US Army Hercules batteries deployed in Germany, Greece, Greenland, Italy, Korea, Okinawa, Taiwan, and Turkey.

In 1961, SAC and the U.S. Army began a joint training mission with benefits for both parties.  SAC needed fresh (simulated) targets which the cities ringed by Nike/Hercules sites provided, and the Army needed live targets to acquire and track with their radar. SAC had many Radar Bomb Scoring (RBS) sites across the country which had very similar acquisition and tracking radar, plus similar computerized plotting boards which were used to record the bomber tracks and bomb release points. Airmen from these sites were assigned TDY to Nike sites across the country to train the Nike crews in RBS procedures.  The distances from the simulated bomb landing point and the "target" were recorded on paper, measured, encoded, and transmitted to the aircrews. The results of these bomb runs were used to promote or demote air crews. ECM activity also took place between the bombers and the Nike sites.  The performance of the NIKE crews improved remarkably with this "live target" practice.

Many Nike Hercules batteries were manned by Army National Guard troops, with a single active Army officer assigned to each battalion to account for the unit's nuclear warheads. The National Guard air defense units shared responsibility for defense of their assigned area with active Army units in the area, and reported to the active Army chain of command. This is the only known instance of Army National Guard units being equipped with operational nuclear weapons.

Nike Zeus

Development continued, producing Improved Nike Hercules and then Nike Zeus A and B. The Zeus was aimed at intercontinental ballistic missiles (ICBMs).

Zeus, with a new 400,000 lbf (1.78 MN) thrust solid-fuel booster, was first test launched during August 1959 and demonstrated a top speed of 8,000 mph (12,875 km/h). The Nike Zeus system utilized the ground-based Zeus Acquisition Radar (ZAR), a significant improvement over the Nike Hercules HIPAR guidance system. Shaped like a pyramid, the ZAR featured a Luneburg lens receiver aerial weighing about 1,000 tons. The first successful intercept of an ICBM by Zeus was in 1962, at Kwajalein in the Marshall Islands.  Despite its technological advancements, the Department of Defense terminated Zeus development in 1963. The Zeus system, which cost an estimated $15 billion, still suffered from several technical flaws that were believed to be uneconomical to overcome.

Still, the Army continued to develop an anti-ICBM weapon system referred to as "Nike-X" – that was largely based on the technological advances of the Zeus system. Nike-X featured phase-array radars, computer advances, and a missile tolerant of skin temperatures three times those of the Zeus. In September 1967, the Department of Defense announced the deployment of the LIM-49A Spartan missile system, its major elements drawn from Nike X development.

In March 1969. the Army started the anti-ballistic missile Safeguard Program, which was designed to defend Minuteman ICBMs, and which was also based on the Nike-X system. It became operational in 1975, but was shut down after just three months.

Nike-X 

Nike-X was a proposed US Army anti-ballistic missile (ABM) system designed to protect major cities in the United States from attacks by the Soviet Union's ICBM fleet. The name referred to its experimental basis, it was intended to be replaced by a more appropriate name when the system was put into production. This never came to pass; the original Nike-X concept was replaced by a much more limited defense system known as the Sentinel program that used some of the same equipment.

Nike-X was a response to the failure of the earlier Nike Zeus system. Zeus had been designed to face a few dozen Soviet ICBMs in the 1950s, and its design would mean it was largely useless by mid-1960s when it would be facing hundreds. It was calculated that a salvo of only four ICBMs would have a 90% chance of hitting the Zeus base, as their radars could only track a few warheads at the same time. Worse, the attacker could use radar reflectors or high-altitude nuclear explosions to obscure the warheads until they were too close to attack, making a single warhead attack highly likely to succeed.

Nike-X addressed these concerns by basing its defense on a very fast, short-range missile known as Sprint. Large numbers would be clustered near potential targets, allowing successful interception right up to the last few seconds of the warhead's re-entry. They would operate below the altitude where decoys or explosions had any effect. Nike-X also used a new radar system that could track hundreds of objects at once, allowing salvoes of many Sprints. It would require dozens of missiles to overwhelm the system. Nike-X considered retaining the longer range Zeus missile, and later developed an extended range version known as Zeus EX. It played a secondary role in the Nike-X system, intended primarily for use in areas outside the Sprint protected regions.

Nike-X required at least one interceptor missile to attack each incoming warhead. As the USSR's missile fleet grew, the cost of implementing Nike-X began to grow as well. Looking for lower-cost options, a number of studies carried out between 1965 and 1967 examined a variety of scenarios where a limited number of interceptors might still be militarily useful. Among these, the I-67 concept suggested building a lightweight defense against very limited attacks. When the Chinese exploded their first H-bomb in 1967, I-67 was promoted as a defense against a Chinese attack, and this system became Sentinel in October. Nike-X development, in its original form, ended.

Decommissioning

Soviet development of ICBMs decreased the value of the Nike (aircraft) air defense system.  Beginning around 1965, the number of Nike batteries was reduced. Thule air defense was reduced during 1965 and SAC air base defense during 1966, reducing the number of batteries to 112.  Budgetary cuts reduced that number to 87 in 1968, and 82 in 1969.

Some small-scale work to use Nike Zeus as an anti-satellite weapon (ASAT) was carried out from 1962 until the project was canceled in favor of the Thor based Program 437 system during 1966.
In the end, neither development would enter service. However, the Nike Zeus system did demonstrate a hit to kill capability against ballistic missiles during the early 1960s. See National Missile Defense and anti-ballistic missile systems.

Nike Hercules was included in SALT I discussions as an ABM.  Following the treaty signed during 1972, and further budget reduction, almost all Nike sites in the continental United States were deactivated by April 1974.  Some units remained active until the later part of that decade in a coastal air defense role.

Specifications

Support vehicles

These trucks and trailers were used with the Nike system.
Trucks
 M254 truck, missile rocket motor, Nike Ajax
 M255 truck, body section, Nike Ajax
 M256 truck, inert, Nike Ajax
 M257 truck, inert, Nike Ajax
 M442 truck, guided missile, rocket motor, Nike Hercules
 M451 truck, guided missile test set, Nike Hercules
  M473 truck, guided missile body section, Nike Hercules
 M489 truck, missile nose section, Nike Hercules

 G789 Trailers

 M242 trailer, M33 fire control, radar dish van mount, 2-ton,
 M243 trailer, M33 fire control, antenna hauler, 2-ton,
 M244 trailer, M33 fire control, computer van, 2-ton,
 M258 van, radar tracking central
 M259 van, guided missile directors trailer
 M260 low bed antenna mount
 M261 flat bed, guided missile
 M262 van, launch control station
 M304 van, electronic shop, Nike Ajax
 M359 van, electronic repair shop
 M382 van, electronic repair shop
 M383 van, electronic repair shop
 M406 low bed antenna mount
 M424 van, guided missile directors trailer
 M428 van, guided missile tracking station
 M429 dolly, for Nike trailers

 M430 dolly, trailer, rear, for Nike trailers
 M431 dolly, trailer, front, for Nike trailers
 M432 dolly, trailer, rear, for Nike trailers
 M529 trailer, low bed, 7-ton, missile, Nike
 M564 trailer van, electronic shop, 9-ton,
 M565 dolly, trailer, front,
 M573 dolly, front, launch control station,
 M582 van, shop
 M583 van, shop
 M584 dolly, trailer, front,
 M589 dolly, trailer, front, electronic,
 M595 dolly, trailer, front, antenna,
 M657 trailer, van radar simulator test station,
 M699 dolly trailer, rear,
 M802 trailer, electric shop, radar course direct central, Nike Hercules

Deployment

By 1958, the Army deployed nearly 200 Nike Ajax batteries at 40 "Defense Areas" within the United States (including Alaska and Hawaii) in which Project Nike missiles were deployed. Within each Defense Area, a "Ring of Steel" was developed with a series of Nike Integrated Firing and Launch Sites constructed by the Corps of Engineers.

The deployment was designed to initially supplement and then replace gun batteries deployed around the nation's major urban areas and vital military installations. The defense areas consisted of major cities and selected United States Air Force Strategic Air Command bases which were deemed vital to national defense. The original basing strategy projected a central missile assembly point from which missiles would be taken out to prepared above-ground launch racks ringing the defended area. However, the Army discarded this semimobile concept because the system needed to be ready for instantaneous action to fend off a "surprise attack." Instead, a fixed-site scheme was devised.

Due to geographical factors, the placement of Nike batteries differed at each location. Initially, the planners chose fixed sites well away from the defended area and the Corps of Engineers Real Estate Offices began seeking tracts of land in rural areas. However, Army planners determined that close-in perimeter sites would provide enhanced firepower. Staggering sites between outskirt and close-in locations to urban areas gave defenders a greater defense-in-depth capability.

Each Nike missile battery was divided into two basic parcels: the Battery Control Area and the Launch Area.

The Battery Control Area contained the radar and computer equipment. Housing and administration buildings, including the mess hall, barracks, and recreation facilities, were sometimes located in a third parcel of land. More likely, however, the housing and administration buildings were located at either the Battery Control Area or the Launch Area, depending upon site configuration, obstructions, and the availability of land.

The Launch Area provided for the maintenance, storage, testing, and firing of the Nike missiles. The selection of this area was primarily influenced by the relatively large amount of land required, its suitability to extensive underground construction, and the need to maintain a clear line-of-sight between the missiles in the Launch Area and the missile-tracking-radar in the Battery Control Area.

The first Nike sites featured above-ground launchers. This quickly changed as land restrictions forced the Army to construct space-saving underground magazines. Capable of hosting 12 Nike Ajax missiles, each magazine had an elevator that lifted the missile to the surface in a horizontal position. Once above ground, the missile could be pushed
manually along a railing to a launcher placed parallel to the elevator. Typically, four launchers sat atop the magazine.
Near the launchers, a trailer housed the launch control officer and the controls he operated to launch missiles. In addition to the launch control trailer, the launch area contained a generator building with three diesel generators, frequency converters, and missile assembly and maintenance structures.

Because of the larger size of the Nike Hercules, an underground magazine's capacity was reduced to eight missiles. Thus, storage racks, launcher rails, and elevators underwent modification to accept the larger missiles. Two additional features that readily distinguished newly converted sites were the double fence and the kennels housing dogs that patrolled the perimeter between the two fences.

The Nike Hercules was designed to use existing Nike Ajax facilities. With the greater range of the Nike Hercules allowing for wider area coverage, numerous Nike Ajax batteries were permanently deactivated.  In addition, sites located further
away from target areas were desirable due to the nuclear warheads carried by the missile. Unlike the older Ajax sites, these batteries were placed in locations that optimized the missiles' range and minimized the warhead damage. Nike Hercules batteries at SAC bases and in Hawaii were installed in an outdoor configuration. In Alaska, a unique above-ground shelter configuration was provided for batteries guarding Anchorage and Fairbanks. Local Corps of Engineer Districts supervised the conversion of Nike Ajax batteries and the construction of new Nike Hercules batteries.

Nike missiles remained deployed around strategically important areas within the continental United States until 1974. The Alaskan sites were deactivated in 1978 and Florida sites stood down during the following year. Although the missile left the U.S. inventory, other nations maintained the missiles in their inventories into the early 1990s and sent their soldiers to the United States to conduct live-fire exercises at Fort Bliss, Texas.

Leftover traces of the approximately 265 Nike missile bases can still be seen around cities across the country. As the sites were decommissioned they were first offered to federal agencies. Many were already on Army National Guard bases who continued to use the property. Others were offered to state and local governments while others were sold to school districts. The left-overs were offered to private individuals. Thus, many Nike sites are now municipal yards, communications and FAA facilities (the IFC areas), probation camps, and even renovated for use as Airsoft gaming and MilSim training complexes. Several were obliterated and turned into parks. Some are now private residences. Only a few remain intact and preserve the history of the Nike project. There are also a few sites abroad, notably in Germany, Turkey and Greece.

Defense areas within the United States were:

 Anchorage Defense Area, AK
 Barksdale Defense Area, LA
 Bergstrom AFB Defense Area, TX
 Boston Defense Area, MA
 Bridgeport Defense Area, CT
 Chicago–Gary Defense Area, IL-IN
 Cincinnati–Dayton Defense Area, OH-IN
 Cleveland Defense Area, OH
 Dallas–Fort Worth Defense Area, TX
 Detroit Defense Area, MI
 Dyess AFB Defense Area, TX
 Ellsworth AFB Defense Area, SD
 Fairbanks Defense Area, AK
 Fairchild AFB Defense Area, WA
 Hanford Defense Area, WA
 Hartford Defense Area. CT
 Homestead–Miami Defense Area, FL
 Kansas City Defense Area, KS-MO
 Lincoln AFB Defense Area, NE
 Loring AFB Defense Area, ME
 Los Angeles Defense Area, CA
 Milwaukee Defense Area, WI
 Minneapolis–St.Paul Defense Area, MN
 New York Defense Area, NY
 Niagara Falls–Buffalo Defense Area, NY
 Norfolk Defense Area, VA
 Oahu Defense Area, HI
 Offutt AFB Defense Area, NE
 Philadelphia Defense Area, PA-NJ
 Pittsburgh Defense Area, PA
 Providence Defense Area, RI-MA
 Robbins AFB Defense Area, GA
 St. Louis Defense Area, MO
 San Francisco Defense Area, CA
 Schilling AFB Defense Area, KS
 Seattle Defense Area, WA
 Travis AFB Defense Area, CA
 Turner AFB Defense Area, GA
 Walker AFB Defense Area, NM
 Washington–Baltimore Defense Area, MD-VA

Nike booster motor as sounding rocket stage

The Nike boosters were also used as stages in sounding rockets as they became surplus starting in the 1950s in the following versions:
Nike Apache (Argo-13)
Nike-Asp (ASPAN)
Nike Cajun
Nike Deacon
Nike Genie
Nike Hawk
Nike Hydac
Nike Iroquois
Nike Javelin
Nike Malemute
Nike Nike
Nike Orion
Nike Recruit
Nike T40 T55
Nike Tomahawk
Nike Viper
Nike-Python
Nike-Yardbird
Nike-Smoke
Nike-Nike

Survivors

Bases

 The best preserved Nike installation is site SF88L located in the Marin Headlands just west of the Golden Gate Bridge, north of San Francisco, California. The site is a museum, and contains the missile bunkers, and control area, as well as period uniforms and vehicles that would have operated at the site. The site has been preserved in the condition it was in at the time it was decommissioned in 1974. The site began as a Nike Ajax base and was later converted to Nike Hercules. Three Nike Hercules are displayed in the original bunkers. The base is open to the public, including demonstrations of the operational missile lift from the bunker to the surface.  Hours and tours vary during the year, but are usually held on Saturdays.  Additional days may be added during the summer and holidays.
 The second best preserved Nike installation is site NY-56 at Fort Hancock in Sandy Hook, New Jersey. The site has been restored and contains the original missile bunkers, as well as three Nike Ajax and a Nike Hercules on display. Each fall the base holds a Cold War Day. Tours one weekend a month from April to October. The site is on the National Register of Historic Places. It is open to the public.  Tours are conducted by members of the Fort Hancock Nike Association.
 HM69 in Everglades National Park has a Nike Hercules restored by George T. Baker Aviation School students. The Nike site is operated by the National Park Service and is open in the winter for guided tours.
 San Vicente Mountain Park is a former Nike site on Mulholland Drive in the Santa Monica Mountains, California.
 In Carrollton, part of Isle of Wight County, Virginia, the Nike Park is a county owned park and recreation area that houses the former Nike missile base.  Several original buildings still stand and are used on a daily basis.  One building is still a voting location for residents.  The underground missile compartments are still there with the concrete pads that covered the missile storage silos.  The county has considered demolishing the buildings in the early 2000s in favor of modern buildings but opposition from historians preserved the structures.  The City of Hampton recently agreed to donate its Nike missiles to the county to display at the park.

Missiles
 Two Nike Ajax are on display at The AAF Tank And Ordnance Museum in Danville, VA 
A Nike Zeus is on display at the Space Camp in Huntsville, Alabama.
 Two Nike Ajax are on display at Camp Navajo in Bellemont, Arizona.
 A Nike Ajax, Nike Hercules, and Nike Zeus are on display at the Redstone Arsenal in Alabama.
 A Nike Ajax and Nike Hercules are on display at the Royal Museum of the Army and Military History in Brussels, Belgium.
 A Nike missile is on display at Camp San Luis Obispo near Morro Bay, California.
 A Nike Ajax and a Nike Hercules are on display at the Peterson Air and Space Museum in Colorado Springs, Colorado.
 Two Nike Ajax and a Hercules are on display at the Cape Canaveral Space & Missile Museum in Cape Canaveral, Florida.
 A Nike Ajax is on display at the War Museum in Athens, Greece.
 A Nike Ajax on its launcher and a Hercules are on display in front of the American Legion post in Cedar Lake, Indiana.
 A Nike missile is on display at the Combat Air Museum in Topeka, Kansas.
 A Nike Ajax is on display in Marion, Kentucky.
 A Nike Ajax and Hercules are on display at the Aberdeen Proving Grounds in Aberdeen, Maryland.
 A Nike Ajax is on display in front of the VFW post in Hancock, Maryland.
 Two Nike Ajax and a Hercules are on display at a small Cold War museum in Ft. Meade, Maryland.
 A Nike Ajax and Hercules are on display at the Dutch Air Force Museum in Soesterberg Air Base.
 A Nike Ajax is on display at The Space Center in Alamogordo, New Mexico.
 A Nike Ajax is on display near the administrative buildings at the former Nike site in Rustan, about 40 km to the southwest of Oslo, Norway.
 Two Nike Ajax and a Nike Hercules are on display near the Bataan Building at Camp Perry, near Port Clinton, Ohio.
 A Nike Ajax is on display near the Toledo Rockets Glass Bowl Stadium on the campus of the University of Toledo in Toledo, Ohio.
 A Nike Ajax is displayed in front of an Army Surplus store located near the Letterkenny Army Depot in Pennsylvania.
 A Nike Ajax and Hercules are on display at the Pennsylvania National Guard Department of Military Arts building at Fort Indiantown Gap, Pennsylvania.
 A Nike Ajax and Hercules are on display at the Air Power Park in Hampton, Virginia.  At least one of these missiles has been agreed to be donated by the city to the County of Isle of Wight for display at Carrollton Nike Park.
 A Nike Ajax missile cutaway, as well as a complete Nike Ajax missile are on display at the Udvar-Hazy Center of the Smithsonian Air & Space Museum at Washington Dulles International Airport, in Chantilly, Virginia.
 A Nike Ajax and Nike Hercules are on display in the Berryman War Memorial Park in Bridgeport, Washington.
 A Nike Hercules and transport trailer are on display at the Ft. Lewis Military Museum in Tacoma, Washington.
 A Nike Ajax on its launcher is on display outside an American Legion hall in Okauchee Lake, Wisconsin.
 A Nike Hercules on its transporter (trailer) is on display outside a public storage (former site MS-20) facility in Roberts, Wisconsin. http://www.nikestorage.com/history-of-the-site/
 A Nike Ajax is on display in front of the American Legion Post in Waynesboro, Pennsylvania.
 A Nike Hercules is on display outside the Royal Norwegian Air Force's training centre at Kjevik, Norway.
 A Nike Hercules and what seems to be the tip of a Nike Ajax is on display at Trøgstad Fort, about 45 km to the southeast of Oslo, Norway.
 A Nike Hercules is on display at Stævnsfortet, about 50 km south of Copenhagen.
 A Nike Hercules is on display in a park in St. Bonifacius, Minnesota.
 A Nike Hercules is on display in Young Patriot's Park(Formally Nike base D-54) in Riverview, Michigan.
 A Nike Ajax missile is on display at Richard Montgomery High School in Rockville, Maryland.
 A Nike Ajax and Hercules on launchers and an additional Nike Ajax and Hercules missile without launchers are on display at the Air Defense Artillery Museum. Fort Sill, Oklahoma
 A Nike Ajax is on display in front of Villa Park VFW Post 2801 in Villa Park Illinois.

See also
 Wasserfall was a World War II German project for a surface-to-air missile.
 Missile guidance
 Sprint
 LIM-49 Spartan
 Safeguard Program
 S-25 Berkut
 Soviet Air Defence Forces
 ABM-1 Galosh
 List of U.S. military vehicles by supply catalog designation (G-789)
 Cold War Museum
 List of U.S. Army Rocket Launchers By Model Number

Sources

References

External links

 Nike Missile Manual Collection
 The Continental Air Defense Collection  at the United States Army Center of Military History
 Video Documentary of History of Nike-Hercules Project in U.S.
 Community für ehemaliges Nike-Hercules-Personal (In German)
 Nike missile site at alpha.fdu.edu
 Nike Historical Society
 Nike Hercules in Alaska
 Nike Zeus info
 Pictures of a demilitarized Nike site in Germany
 Nike Sites of the Los Angeles Defense Area
 The Nike Missile Program, Doug Crompton Area Hoejerup and Stevns Fort. Denmark. English/danish
 Nike Ajax Explosion Marker: Gateway National Recreation Area 
 
 
 Huell Howser. "Nike Missile Site". California's Golden Parks. Episode 159.

 
Rockets and missiles
Cold War surface-to-air missiles of the United States
MIM003
United States Army projects